Tengo Razones para Seguir (I have reasons to keep on going) is the twelfth studio album by Argentine rock band Vox Dei. It represents the second album recorded after the return in 1986, to commemorate the 20th anniversary of Vox Dei.

It was the first Vox Dei studio album in ten years, and the first with the third line-up (Soulé, Quiroga, Basoalto), since Gata de Noche in 1978. 
Contains several unreleased tracks with a sound influenced by the 1980s music.

After the presentations, Ricardo Soulé left the band once again in 1989 and moved to Spain, partly due to economic situation in Argentina.

Songs
All songs written by Ricardo Soulé, except where noted.

Credits 
Vox Dei
Willy Quiroga - Bass guitar, Keyboards on "No me vengas con historias" and "Un corazón dispuesto", Piano on "Tiempo de conversar" and Vocals.
Rubén Basoalto -  Drums.
Ricardo Soulé - Guitar, Violin and Vocals.

Guest
Chiche Graciano - Keyboards.
César Pacheco - String arrangements on "Tiempo de conversar".

Additional personnel 
Eduardo Bertran - Technician.
Julio Presas - Engineer.
Mario Procurito - Assistant.
The Image Bank Argentina - Cover design.
Artistic Production by Vox Dei.

External links
Vox Dei's official webpage (Spanish)
Vox Dei discography (Spanish)

References

Vox Dei albums
1988 albums